The women's artistic team competition at the 2015 Southeast Asian Games was held on 7 June 2015 at the Bishan Sports Hall in Singapore.

The team competition also served as qualification for the individual all-around and event finals.

Schedule
All times are Singapore Standard Time (UTC+8).

Results

Qualification results

Individual all-around

Vault

Uneven bars

Balance beam

Floor exercise

References

External links
 
 

Women's artistic team
Women's sports competitions in Singapore
2015 in women's gymnastics